Sev Aszkenazy is an American real estate developer in San Fernando, California.

Early life
Sev Askenazy was born in 1961. He was brought up by his lone parent Mexican American mother, who had an affair with Severyn Ashkenazy whilst he was a student at the University of California, Los Angeles. His mother slightly changed the surname and brought him up as a Catholic. He was educated at San Fernando High School. He finally met his father when he was in his 20s.

Career
Askenazy worked for his father for six years, before starting Pueblo Contracting and Aszkenazy Development in San Fernando. With his wife, he owns thirty buildings in San Fernando.

In 2011, the Los Angeles Times called Aszkenazy a "powerful figure in town", and noted that the mayor, Mario Hernandez, had contended that Aszkenazy was using his ownership of the local newspaper the San Fernando Valley Sun to fuel controversy because he was not getting his way on development projects. Aszkenazy's wife is the sister of the mayor's estranged wife.

Personal life
He is married to Martha Diaz Aszkenazy, whom he met in high school.

References

Living people
People from San Fernando, California
San Fernando High School alumni
American real estate businesspeople
American newspaper executives
Place of birth missing (living people)
Businesspeople from California
American people of Polish-Jewish descent
American people of Mexican descent
1961 births